Rinad Salavatovich Yulmukhametov  (born 17 January 1957) is a Russian mathematician.

Biography
Yulmukhametov was born in the village Urge Atkol in Ishimbaysky District, now in Bashkortostan. He graduated from the Department of Mathematics of Bashkir State University and defended his doctoral thesis in 1987. 
1995-2009 he is the head of the Department of Programming and Economic Informatics.

Advances in science 
 Existence theorems for entire functions with given asymptotic behavior; 
 Solved the problem of spectral synthesis in the space of solutions of a homogeneous convolution equation; 
 Solved factorization problem Ehrenpreis.

Works
  Пространство H(p) в круге. сб. БФАН СССР, Уфа, 1981.
  Достаточные множества в одном пространстве целых функций. Математический сб. т.116, No. 3, 1981.
  Целые функции, имеющие заданный индикатор роста и хорошую асимптотическую оценку. сб. БФАН СССР, Уфа, 1982
  Асимптотическая аппроксимация целых функций. ДАН СССР, т.264, No. 4, 1982
  Пространства аналитичексих функций, имеющих заданный рост вблизи границы. Математические заметки, т.32, No. 1, 1982
  Приближение субгармонических функций. Математический сб. т.124, No. 3, 1984
  Двойственность в выпуклых областях. сб. БФАН СССР, Уфа, 1984
  Асимптотическая аппроксимация субгармонических функций. Сибирский мат. жур. т.26, No. 4, 1985
  Аппроксимация субгармонических функций. Analysis Mathematica, т.11, No. 3, 1985
  Квазианалитические классы функций в выпуклых областях. Математический сб., т.130, No. 4, 1986
  Асимптотика плюрисубгармонических функций. препринт БФАН СССР, Уфа, 1987
  Асимптотика разности субгармонических функций. Математические. заметки, т.41, No. 3, 1987
 Аппроксимация опорных функций. Труды Всесоюзного симпозиума по теории приближения функций, Уфа, 1987
  Достаточные множества в одном пространстве целых функций. сб. БФАН СССР, Уфа, 1987
  Аппроксимация однородных субгармоничесих функций. Математический сб., т.134, No. 4, 1987
  Асимптотика многомерного интеграла Лапласа. сб. БНЦ УрО АН СССР, Уфа, 1989
  Луценко В. И. Обобщение теоремы Пэли-Винера на весовые пространства. Математ. заметки, т.48, No. 5,1990
  Однородные уравнения свертки. ДАН СССР, т.316, No. 2, 1991
 Луценко В. И. Теорема Пэли-Винера в пространствах Смирнова. Труды МИАН СССР им. В. А. Стеклова, 1991
  Напалков В. В. (мл.) Весовые преобразования Фурье-Лапласа аналитических функционалов в круге. Математический сб., т.183, No. 11, 1992
 Напалков В. В. (мл.) О преобразовании Коши функционалов на пространстве Бергмана. Математический сб., т. 185, No. 7, 1994
  Преобразование Фурье-Лапласа функционалов. кн. Линейные операторы в комплексном анализе", Ростов-на-Дону, 1994
  Расщепление целых функций с нулями в полосе. Математический сб., т. 186, No. 7, 1995
  Проблема Эйренпрайса о факторизации в алгебрах гладких функций. Школа-конференция «Теория функций и ее приложения», Казань, 1995
 Разложение целых функций на произведение двух функций эквивалентного роста. Математический сб., т.187, No. 7, 1996
  Целые функции многих переменных с заданным поведением в бесконечности. Изв. РАН. сер. мат., т.60, No. 4, 1996
  Решение проблемы Эйренпрайса. Вестник БГУ, No. 1, 1996
  Разложение целых функций на произведение двух «почти равных» функций. Сибир. мат. жур., т.38, No. 2, 1997
  Гладкая регуляризация плюрисубгармонических функций. Тезисы док. межд. конф. по компл. анализу и смеж. вопросам. Н.Новгород, 1997
  Регуляризация плюрисубгармонических функций. Матем. заметки, т.62, No. 2, 1997
  Целые функции с заданным асимптотическим поведением. Функ. анализ и его прил. т.32, No. 3, 1998
  Луценко В. И. On Entire Functions with Given Asymptotic Behavior. Complex Variables, V.37, 1998
  Решение проблемы Л. Эйренпрайса о факторизации. Докл. РАН, т.360, No. 1, 1998
  Решение проблемы Л. Эйренпрайса о факторизации. Математический сб., т.190, No. 4, 1999
  Абузярова Н. Ф. Сопряженные пространства к весовым пространствам аналитических функций. Сибир. мат. жур., т.42, No. 1, 2001
  Трунов К. В. Квазианалитичность и задача Дирихле. Труды Матем. Центра им. Н. И. Лобачевского, Казань, 2001
  Трунов К. В. Quasianalicity, completeness of polynomials and the Dirichlet problem. Intern. Akhiezer Centenary Conf. «Theory of functions and math. physics», Kharkiv, 2001`
  Исаев К. П. The Laplace transform of functionals on Bergman space. Inter. Conf. On Comp. Analysis And Poten. Theory, Kiev, 2001
  Абузярова Н. Ф. The Cauchy transform on weighted spaces of analytic functions and some Hilbert scales. Inter. Conf. On Comp. Analysis And Poten. Theory, Kiev, 2001
  Напалков В. В. (мл.) О преобразовании Гильберта в пространствах Бергмана. Матем. заметки, т.70, вып.1, 2001

References

 http://www.rbtl.ru/fakultets/mat_fak1/cafedra/Programmir/Yulmuhametov.html
 • Газета «Республика Башкортостан»
 Персоналии: Юлмухаметов Ринад Салаватович

Living people
20th-century Russian mathematicians
Soviet mathematicians
1957 births
People from Ishimbaysky District
21st-century Russian mathematicians
Bashkir State University alumni